Divaricella is a genus of bivalves belonging to the family Lucinidae.

The genus has almost cosmopolitan distribution.

Species

Species:

Divaricella angulifera 
Divaricella chavani 
Divaricella chipolana

References

Lucinidae
Bivalve genera